The Melton Mowbray Pork Pie Association is a group of pork pie manufacturers in the Melton Mowbray area of England, UK. The association was set up in 1998 with the aim of helping to protect the Melton Mowbray pork pie recipe.

Product protection under the EU
In 1999 the association, a group of seven local manufacturers, applied to the EU to have their products categorised as having Protected Geographical Indication, to ensure that only pies made in an area around Melton Mowbray could use the Melton Mowbray name.

Northern Foods, a large food corporation, tried to prevent this move over the usage of "Melton Mowbray" on the wrappings of its own pork pies. Northern Foods viewed the situation as unfair and stated in press releases that the MMPPA's dominant member, Samworth Brothers, has made cured and uncured pork pies in Leicester and that the designation area was shaped to include the Samworth factory there. According to Northern Foods, 99% of the pork pies made under the association banner are made by Samworth Brothers. Northern Foods took the matter to the European Court of Justice, but the appeal was eventually withdrawn. Northern Foods' move against the new requirements was dismissed by the High Court.

The PGI application was finally granted on 4 April 2008 and the PGI status came into effect in July 2009.

The name Melton Mowbray can now only be applied to uncured pork-filled pies cooked without supporting hoops and made within a 10.8 square mile (28 square kilometre) zone around the town. Permissible ingredients are fresh pork (pies must be at least 30% meat), shortening (usually lard), pork gelatine or stock, wheat flour, water, salt and spices (predominantly pepper). Artificial colours, flavours and preservatives are not allowed.

Prior to PGI status coming into effect, Pork Farms (which had taken over Northern Foods' pork pie interests) announced that their Bowyers factory at Trowbridge in Wiltshire would close with the loss of 400 jobs. Production of the (mainly Melton Mowbray branded) pies was transferred to Nottingham, which is inside the area in which Melton Mowbray pies can be made under the PGI rules.

Members
Members argue that the association provides protection for smaller producers.

Current members are:
 Mrs King's Pork Pies of Cotgrave
 F Bailey & Son of Upper Broughton
 Dickinson & Morris of Melton Mowbray
 Brocklebys of Melton Mowbray
 Mark Patrick Butchers of Birstall
 Walker & Son of Beaumont Leys
 Leesons Butchers of Oakham
 Nelsons Family Butchers of Stamford, Lincolnshire
 Dunkleys of Wellingborough
 Hartland Pies of Cotgrave

See also
List of United Kingdom food and drink products with protected status

References

External links
 Website

News items
 Melton Mobray Pork Pies featured in this article regarding the Brexit trade deal (The Independent) December 2020
 Melton’s iconic pork pie shop set to reopen after coronavirus restrictions were lifted (Melton Times) June 2020
 Boris Johnson pork pie claims dismissed as ‘not true’ by Melton Mowbray (i News) August 2019
 Today programme (BBC News) April 2009
 EU Status granted (BBC News) October 2008
 Nelsons in Stamford provides pork pies for the Queen (BBC News) December 2007
 Northern Foods drops pie challenge (BBC News) November 2006
 European Court of Appeal (BBC News) March 2006
 Northern Foods battles over its Trowbridge and Market Drayton pork pie factories (BBC News) January 2006
 Wanting pork pies protected (BBC News) July 2004
 Andrew Murrison complains (BBC News) June 2004
 Pork pies (BBC News) March 2003

Meat processing in the United Kingdom
Organizations established in 1998
Organisations based in Leicestershire
Food industry trade groups based in the United Kingdom
Melton Mowbray
1998 establishments in England
Meat industry organizations